Maria Wolfram (born 1961) is a Finnish visual artist. She is known for creating art that is viewed through the female perspective.

Education and career
Wolfram enrolled at art school Vapaa Taidekoulu to study painting. She attended Berkshire College of Art and Design in the UK and obtained a foundation diploma in art. Wolfram earned a bachelor's degree in Fine Arts from Kingston University. She obtained her master's from Chelsea College of Art and Design in London.

Wolfram began exhibiting in 1998. Since then, she has participated in many art fairs and festivals around the world. Wolfram has held solo exhibitions outside Finland, namely in Japan, Belgium, Sweden etc. She had worked as an artist-in-residence at the Finnish Institute in Athens, among others.

Wolfram began tutoring art under vocational and technical school, Axxell City, in 2011. She held governing positions in several Finnish art organizations. She is a member of several art associations in Finland, such as the Taidemaalariliitto (Finnish Painters’ Union).

Wolfram is a recipient of many awards and grants in England and in Finland. In 2018, she received a project award from Konstsamfundet rf and Svenska Kulturfonden.

Art
Wolfram is a painter and installation artist. She creates art with a contemporary approach, valuing elements such as experimentation and materiality. Wolfram uses mixed materials such as stockings, feathers and various textiles on her sculpture; she would mix oil, acrylic and ink, although she often uses oil in painting.

Wolfram exhibits large-scale oil paintings on wooden panels. She likes to delve in narrative painting — where feminism, identity and power are recurring topics. She takes inspiration from folklore and mythology, and she is interested in the interpretation of history from different cultures. Fueled by the insufficient coverage of women's contributions throughout history, she creates art that is viewed through the female perspective.

Selected works
In the Shadow of Corona
Sisters are Doing it
Reunion
Lady Huntington
There’s Always be a Sister Somewhere
The Townhall Meeting
All-Kind-of-Ballerinas
Miniatyrri 1
Walk with me
What if Rembrandt had been Rembrandtina
The Scent of Snow

Selected exhibitions

Solo
2020 – “Pow Wow”, Galleria Saskia, Tampere, Finland
2019 – “Almost Touching the Stars”, Ars Gallery, Tokyo, Japan
2019 – Art Goes Kapakka Festival, Helsinki, Finland
2014 – “Among Us”, KuKuk V.o.G, Raeven, Belgium 
2013 – “Merry Go Around”, Galleria Katariina, Helsinki, Finland
2011 – “Surface and Undercurrents”, Kulturcentrum Korpoström, Pargas, Finland
2011 – “There is Room”, Galleria Huuto, Helsinki, Finland
2010 – “Oversea Spotted”, Water Institute Gallery, Tel Aviv, Israel
2004 – “Meetings”, Hanasaaren Kulttuurikeskus, Helsinki, Finland

Group
2019 – “Personal Structures”, Venice, Italy
2019 – “World Art Tokyo” (Representative of Finland), Tokyo, Japan
2018 – “The Finnish Illusion” (with Katja Tukiainen and Llona Cutts), Spruill Gallery, Atlanta, USA
2017 – “Silence and Echo”, Vestjylland Art Museum, Tistrup, Denmark
2016 – “Our Fukishima”, National Institution Museum, Kumanovo, Macedonia
2015 – “NordArt”, Budelsdorf, Germany
2013 – “OpenArt 2013”, Örebro, Sweden
1999 – Stanley Picker Gallery, London, United Kingdom
1998 – Kingston University, London, United Kingdom

Selected collections
Imago Mundi Luciano Benetton Collection
The Finnish State's Art Collection, Finland
Vattenfalls Konstförening rf., Sweden.
German-Finnish Chamber of Commerce, Finland
Ameco International Ltd (British Petrol), United Kingdom

References

1961 births
Living people
20th-century Finnish women artists
21st-century Finnish women artists
Alumni of Chelsea College of Arts
Alumni of Kingston University
Finnish women painters